Cameraria anomala is a moth of the family Gracillariidae. It is known from California, United States.

The length of the forewings is 3–4.8 mm.

The larvae feed on Quercus agrifolia and Quercus wislizeni. They mine the leaves of their host plant.

Etymology
The specific name is derived from the Greek anomalus (meaning uneven, irregular) in reference to the highly irregular margin of the male valvae.

References

Cameraria (moth)
Lepidoptera of the United States
Moths of North America
Leaf miners
Moths described in 1981
Taxa named by Donald R. Davis (entomologist)
Taxa named by Paul A. Opler